AISK may refer to:
 American International School of Kingston
 American International School of Kraków (now International School of Kraków)
 American International School of Kuwait